Events from the year 1870 in the United Kingdom.

Incumbents
 Monarch – Victoria
 Prime Minister – William Ewart Gladstone (Liberal)
 Parliament – 20th

Events
 28 January
 General Post Office takes over business of private telegraph companies.
 Inman Line's  departs Halifax, Nova Scotia, on a passage for Liverpool on which it will be lost with all 191 aboard.
 5 March – first ever (unofficial) international football match, England v Scotland, takes place under the approval of the Football Association at The Oval, London.
 10 May – Jem Mace wins the boxing championship of the world, defeating fellow Englishman Tom Allen at Kenner, near New Orleans.
 19 May – the Home Government Association is established in Ireland by Isaac Butt to argue for devolution for Ireland and repeal of the Act of Union 1800.
 late Spring – Army Enlistment (Short Service) Act allows reduction in length of enlistment to the British Army as part of the Cardwell Reforms.
 2 June – competitive examination for entry to the British civil service introduced.
 8 June – the final splice to the first telegraph submarine cable to India is made off Porthcurno, Cornwall.
 23 June – Keble College, Oxford, opens, the first new college of the University of Oxford in more than a century.
 2 August – official opening of the Tower Subway beneath the River Thames in London, the world's first underground passenger "tube" railway. Although this lasts as a railway operation only until November, it demonstrates the technologically successful first use of the cylindrical wrought iron tunnelling shield devised by Peter W. Barlow and James Henry Greathead.
 4 August – British Red Cross established as the British National Society for Aid to the Sick and Wounded in War by Lord Wantage.
 9 August
 Elementary Education Act 1870 drafted by William Edward Forster MP encourages elementary education by creating a system of secular School boards in England and Wales at whose schools attendance may be compulsory. Women are eligible to stand and vote for local school boards where created.
 Married Women's Property Act confirms that wives may own property of their own.
27 August – White Star's first ocean liner RMS Oceanic is launched by Harland and Wolff in Belfast.
 7 September – masted turret ship HMS Captain capsizes off Cape Finisterre, less than 5 months after commissioning, due to design flaws, with the loss of 481 lives.
 1 October – postcards and halfpenny postage stamps introduced by the Post Office.
 19 October –  is wrecked on Inishtrahull (Ireland) with the loss of 179 lives.
 Undated – the David Greig grocery chain begins with a store in London.

Publications
 1 January
 Completion of the Ordnance Survey one-inch-to-the-mile "Old Series" maps of England.
 The Northern Echo newspaper launched in Darlington.
 April–September – serialisation of Charles Dickens' novel The Mystery of Edwin Drood, only half complete due to his death on 9 June.
 Edward Jenkins' satire Ginx's Baby: his birth and other misfortunes.
 William Robinson's gardening book The Wild Garden.
 Dante Gabriel Rossetti's Poems, exhumed from Elizabeth Siddal's grave.

Births
 7 January – Gordon Hewart, 1st Viscount Hewart, English judge and politician, 7th Lord Chief Justice of England (died 1943)
 25 January – Fred Spiksley, footballer (died 1948)
 5 February – C. E. Brock, painter and illustrator (died 1938)
 12 February – Marie Lloyd, music-hall singer (died 1922)
 4 March – Thomas Sturge Moore, poet, author and artist (died 1944)
 17 March – Horace Donisthorpe, entomologist (died 1951)
 9 May – Harry Vardon, golfer (died 1937)
 4 August – Harry Lauder, Scottish entertainer (died 1950)
 11 August – Tom Richardson, cricketer (died 1912)
 12 August – Hubert Gough, general (died 1963)
 22 August – Bertram Fletcher Robinson, journalist, editor and author (died 1907)
 1 September – Leopold Wharton, English-born American film director (died 1927)
 22 September – Charlotte Cooper, tennis player (died 1966)
 21 October – Horace Hood, admiral (killed in action 1916)
 22 October – Lord Alfred Douglas, minor Uranian poet best remembered as a lover of writer Oscar Wilde (died 1945)
 30 October – Lawrence Grant, film actor (died 1952 in the United States)
 18 November – P. Morley Horder, architect (died 1944)
 18 December – Saki (H. H. Munro), short-story writer (killed in action 1916)
 Doncaster, racehorse (died 1892)

Deaths
 2 January – Ignatius Bonomi, architect and surveyor (born 1787)
 9 January – Elizabeth Sackville-West, Countess De La Warr, peeress (born 1795)
 20 January – Sir George Seymour, admiral of the fleet (born 1787)
 25 January – Janet Taylor, mathematician and navigational instrument maker (born 1804)
 30 March – William Hale, inventor (born 1797)
 25 April – Daniel Maclise, historical painter (born 1806)
 6 May – Sir James Young Simpson, physician and researcher (born 1811)
 14 May – Thomas Dale, Anglican priest, Dean of Rochester (born 1797)
 17 May – David Octavius Hill, Scottish painter and pioneer photographer (born 1802)
 24 April – Louisa Stuart Costello, miniature-painter, poet, historical novelist and travel writer (born 1799)
 9 June – Charles Dickens, novelist (born 1812)
 27 June – George Villiers, 4th Earl of Clarendon, diplomat and statesman (born 1800)
 12 September – Eleanora Atherton, philanthropist in Manchester (born 1782)
 25 September – John Braithwaite, engineer, inventor of the first steam fire engine (born 1797)
 6 October – James Giles, painter (born 1801)
 21 October – Charles George James Arbuthnot, general (born 1801)
 8 December – Thomas Brassey, railway contractor (born 1805)
 9 December – Patrick MacDowell, sculptor (born 1799)
 28 December – Philip Hardwick, architect (born 1792)

See also
 1870 in Scotland

References

 
Years of the 19th century in the United Kingdom